Gilbert Kirk or Kirkeby (by 1484-1546), of Exeter, Devon, was an English Member of Parliament.

He was a Member (MP) of the Parliament of England for Exeter in 1542. He was Mayor of Exeter 1531-2 and 1539-40.

References

15th-century births
1546 deaths
English MPs 1542–1544
Year of birth uncertain

Mayors of Exeter
People of the Tudor period
Members of the Parliament of England (pre-1707) for Exeter